A broken wand ceremony is a ritual performed at or shortly before the funeral of a magician, in which a wand – either the wand which the magician used in performances, or a ceremonial one – is broken, indicating that with the magician's death, the wand has lost its magic.

The first broken wand ceremony was held in 1926, after the death of Harry Houdini. The Society of American Magicians continues to hold an annual ceremony at Houdini's grave.

References

External links
 Guidelines for a Broken Wand Ceremony at the International Brotherhood of Magicians

Acknowledgements of death
Magic (illusion)
Wands